RX Telescopii is an irregular variable  star in the constellation Telescopium. It has a maximum magnitude of 6.45 and a minimum magnitude 7.47.  It is a red supergiant with a spectral type of M3Iab, indicating the star is an intermediate-size luminous supergiant star.

The distance to RX Telescopii is uncertain. However the Gaia database has an astrometric noise value larger than the parallax itself and about ten times larger than the typical maximum for a reliable parallax, thus this distance, hence the radius, are inaccurate.

References

Telescopium (constellation)
Slow irregular variables
Telescopii, RX
M-type supergiants
Durchmusterung objects
177456
TIC objects